Hallencourt is a commune in the Somme department in Hauts-de-France in northern France.

Geography
The commune comprises the two villages of Hallencourt and Hocquincourt.

Population

Places of interest
 The war memorial
 The Château de Beauvoir at Hocquincourt (now a private hotel)

Personalities
Roman Opałka, French artist of Polish ancestry, was born in Hocquincourt in 1931.
Édouard Louis, French writer, is from Hallencourt. He wrote his debut autobiographical novel En finir avec Eddy Bellegueule (2014, translated into English as The End of Eddy) about growing up there.

See also
Communes of the Somme department

References

External links

 Canton of Hallencourt
 opalka1965.com - Roman Opalka website

Communes of Somme (department)